Ivan Nikitovich Sytov (13 June 1916  13 October 1943) was a Soviet flying ace, credited with 25 solo and three shared victories.

Initially serving with Stalingrad's fighter school, Sytov then posted to 788th Fighter Aviation Regiment, where he claimed at least one Bf 109 in September 1942. Lieutenant Ivan Sytov then joined 5th Guards Fighter Aviation Regiment in December 1942.

Sytov fought during the Battle of Stalingrad and Battle of Kursk, scoring the majority of his kills during this period. After intensive operations on the Kalinin Front, the unit withdrew to equip with the new Lavochkin La-5.

On 13 October 1943 Sytov was shot down and killed by JG 52s Oberfeldwebel Walter Jahnke. Some Soviet sources claim he rammed a Bf 109, but according to German records no such incident occurred.

References

Bibliography

External links
 warheroes.ru

1916 births
1943 deaths
People from Saratov Oblast
People from Saratovsky Uyezd
Communist Party of the Soviet Union members
Soviet World War II flying aces
Russian aviators
Soviet military personnel killed in World War II
Aviators killed by being shot down
Heroes of the Soviet Union
Recipients of the Order of Lenin
Recipients of the Order of the Red Banner